Kaweah Health Medical Center is located in Visalia, California, United States  and offers comprehensive health services including cardiac, vascular, colorectal, and general surgery, neurosurgery, oncology, mental health services, orthopedic surgery, adult and neonatal intensive care and pediatrics, and more. It is the largest hospital in Tulare County and Kings County, serving a population of more than 600,000. Kaweah Health is operated by the Kaweah Delta Health Care District, a political subdivision of the State of California which is governed by an elected board of directors.

Overview
Kaweah Health Medical Center has campuses in Tulare and Kings counties serving the Central Valley of Visalia. Its locations consist of Kaweah Health Medical Center, Kaweah Health South Campus, Kaweah Health West Campus, Kaweah Health Woodlake Health Clinic, Kaweah Health Exeter Health Clinic, Kaweah Health Lindsay Health Clinic, Kaweah Health Dinuba Clinic, Kaweah Health Tulare Clinic, Kaweah Health Medical Foundation, Therapy Specialists, and Sequoia Regional Cancer Center Radiation Oncology locations in Visalia and in Hanford. In total, there are 581 beds in the district: 435 general acute care beds at the main hospital, a 54-bed skilled nursing/subacute facility, a 61-bed acute rehabilitation/short-stay SNF facility, and a 63-bed acute inpatient psychiatric facility. Kaweah Delta operates as a non-profit hospital, with less than 1% of funding coming from taxpayers. The Medical Center is a California-designated and American College of Surgeons-verified Trauma Center and serves Tulare County.

History

Kaweah Health Care District was formed in March 1961 by a vote of the community. The Tulare County Board of Supervisors appointed the first governing board. The medical center opened in July 1963, when the Board of Directors leased the former Visalia Municipal Hospital, a 68-bed facility and provided basic health care needs to the local community. Kaweah Health Medical Center is still in operation at this site. The original building, constructed in 1936, was in use until a new hospital building, now the Mineral King building, was ready in 1969. In the 1980s the building footprint was significantly expanded with west and east extensions to accommodate intensive care, labor and delivery, pediatrics and additional dedicated units. In 2004, the southwest tower along Mill Creek was constructed.  It was the site of the Automobile Club of Southern California after it moved from its first office in Visalia in 1941. Kaweah Health's six-floor Acequia Wing opened its doors in 2009, focused on cardiovascular health. It added a new Telemetry Department, Cardiac Surgery and Catheterization Labs, three surgery suites and a Cardiac Intensive Care Unit. Additionally, the wing added 38 post-delivery rooms for mothers and babies and increased the size of the Emergency Department, which handles more than 90,000 visits a year. The expanded ED included four state-of-the-art trauma bays, four critical-care beds, eight new treatment rooms and a helipad. In 2020, the previously shelled-in 5th and 6th floors of the Acequia Wing were opened, adding 24 new intermediate intensive care beds and a state-of-the art 23-bed neonatal intensive care unit (NICU).  In Spring of 2021, Kaweah Health opened an additional expansion of the emergency department, adding 24 new patient rooms to bring the total number of ED rooms to 65, with an addition 8 bays dedicated to expedited care for less intensive patients, in addition Kaweah Delta officially rebranded to Kaweah Health.

In July 2013 Kaweah Health established residency training programs in Family Medicine and Emergency Medicine, followed by a Psychiatry {https://www.kaweahhealth.org/gme-residency-programs/psychiatry/} residency program in 2014, Surgery and Transitional Year programs in 2015, and an Anesthesiology residency in 2017. A Child and Adolescent Psychiatry fellowship program was established in 2022. As of the academic year 2022, all Kaweah Health programs are accredited by the Accreditation Council of Graduate Medical Education (ACGME), and include a total of over 100 training positions.

References

External links
Official Kaweah Health website
Official Kaweah Health Family Medicine Residency website
Official Kaweah Health Emergency Medicine Residency website
Official Kaweah Health Surgery Residency website
Official Kaweah Health Transitional Year Residency website
Official Kaweah Health Anesthesiology Residency website
Official Kaweah Health CAP Fellowship website

Buildings and structures in Visalia, California
Hospital buildings completed in 1961
Hospitals established in 1961
Teaching hospitals in California
Trauma centers